Wallace "Wally" McReddie (1871–1939) was a Scottish was an English footballer who played in the Football League for Middlesbrough Ironopolis, Manchester City and Stoke.

Career
McReddie started his career at local clubs, Lochee and Dundee Harp before moving to English club Stoke in 1889. In his first season with Stoke they had an awful campaign finishing bottom of the Football League and also failed to gain re-election. Stoke joined the Football Alliance and McReddie left the club and signed for Middlesbrough Ironopolis. He spent three seasons with the teesside club before he re-joined Stoke for the 1893–94 season where he played 30 league matches scoring 10 goals. At the end of the season McReddie then moved on to Manchester City and Bolton Wanderers before returning north of the border to Celtic.

Career statistics

References

Scottish footballers
Dundee Harp F.C. players
Middlesbrough Ironopolis F.C. players
Manchester City F.C. players
Stoke City F.C. players
Bolton Wanderers F.C. players
Celtic F.C. players
English Football League players
1871 births
1939 deaths
Footballers from Dundee
People from Lochee
Association football inside forwards